"Sugar Magnolia" is a song by the Grateful Dead. Written by Robert Hunter and Bob Weir, it is one of the most well-known songs by the band, alongside such hits as "Truckin'", "Casey Jones", "Uncle John's Band", "Touch of Grey", and fellow sugar-adjacent tune "Sugaree".

First released on the 1970 album American Beauty, "Sugar Magnolia" made its live debut on June 7, 1970 at the Fillmore West in San Francisco. When performed live, the song was often divided into two different entities: "Sugar Magnolia" proper and the "Sunshine Daydream" coda. The break between the two could be a few beats, a set, or even a few concerts. On one memorable occasion, the week of long-time friend of the band Bill Graham's death, the coda was held off for an entire week.

A single edit of the live performance included on Europe '72 (1972) was the group's third Billboard Top 100 hit, peaking at #91 in 1973.

According to Deadbase X, "Sugar Magnolia" was the Dead's second-most played in concert song of their long career, with 596 performances, trailing only "Me and My Uncle".

It has been said that the song was written about Bob Weir's girlfriend, Frankie Weir (née Azzara), who lived with him for many years. In any case, the song's line "she don't come and I won't follow" echoes the folk song, "Sourwood Mountain", which includes the line "she won't come and I won't call 'er." Aside from obvious references to several types of plants (magnolia), the line "jump like a Willys in four wheel drive" refers to the Willys Jeep, which was actually "jumped" off the ground by some drivers.

The semi-official 1972 Dead movie Sunshine Daydream has its title taken from the song's coda section as well as the popular St. Louis area "Sunshine Daydream" stores.

In Donna Tartt's novel, The Secret History, the hippies would only allow admission to the bunker to those who could recite the second verse of "Sugar Magnolia".

An interesting version with a slightly different melody line was played at Irvine Meadows on April 28, 1989.

A previously unreleased version of the song was included in Duane Allman's box set (Skydog, the Duane Allman Retrospective). As Scott Schinder states in his liner notes, "He (Duane Allman) also sat with the Grateful Dead on multiple occasions, an association that's represented here by an exhilarating, previously unreleased performance of the Dead's 'Sugar Magnolia', on which Duane memorably trades licks with Jerry Garcia".

Appears on
 American Beauty (1970)
 Looney Tunes & Merrie Melodies (Warner Bros. sampler) (1970)
 Europe '72 (1972)
 Skeletons from the Closet: The Best of Grateful Dead (1974)
 Dick's Picks Volume 2 (1995)
 Hundred Year Hall (1995)
 Dick's Picks Volume 6 (1996)
 Dick's Picks Volume 10 (1998)
 Dick's Picks Volume 12 (1998)
 Dick's Picks Volume 14 (1999)
 Dick's Picks Volume 20 (2000)
 The Closing of Winterland (2003)
 Dick's Picks Volume 36 (2005)
 Winterland 1973: The Complete Recordings (2008)
 Ladies and Gentlemen... the Grateful Dead (2000)
 Skydog, the Duane Allman Retrospective (2013)
 Sunshine Daydream (2013)
 Houston, Texas 11-18-1972 (2014)
 Dave's Picks Volume 13 (2015)
 Saint of Circumstance (2019)

References

Grateful Dead songs
Songs written by Bob Weir
1970 songs
Songs with lyrics by Robert Hunter (lyricist)